The Industry Party was a political party in Denmark in the 1910s and 1920s. It aimed to represent small and medium traders, primarily in Copenhagen.

History
The party was established in 1917, and received 1.3% of the vote in the 1918 elections, when it won a single seat. The party increased its vote share to 2.9% in the April 1920 elections, winning four seats. It maintained its four seats in the July 1920 elections, but was reduced to three seats in the September 1920 elections.

In 1922 the party split in two, with both factions significantly weakened. In the 1924 elections the party received just 0.2% of the national vote and lost all three seats.

Election results

Folketing

References

Defunct political parties in Denmark
Political parties established in 1917
1917 establishments in Denmark
Political parties with year of disestablishment missing